Abzu is the sixth and final studio album by American black metal band Absu. It was released in  2011 on Candlelight Records. It features new members in the form of guitarist Vis Crom and bassist/vocalist Ezezu; although Ezezu did join the band after the recording of Absu, this is his first studio recording with Absu.

Track list
Music by Vis Crom & Ezezu. Lyrics by Proscriptor.
 "Earth Ripper" – 3:48
 "Circles of the Oath" – 5:12
 "Abraxas Connexus" – 3:53
 "Skrying in the Spirit Vision" – 3:52
 "Ontologically, It Became Time & Space" – 4:48
 "A Song for Ea including:" – 14:26
 "E-A"
 "A Myriad of Portals"
 "3rd Tablet"
 "Warren of Imhullu"
 "The Waters – The Denizens"
 "E-A" (Reprise)

Personnel

Absu
Ezezu – bass, mellotron, vocals
Vis Crom – electric & acoustic guitars
Proscriptor McGovern – drums, percussion, mellotron, vocals

Additional personnel
Rune "Blasphemer" Ericksen (formerly of the Norwegian black metal band Mayhem; now with Ava Inferi) – all lead guitars

Production
 Executive production: Candlelight Records
 Produced & engineered by Absu
 Mixed by J.T. Longoria
 Mastered & edited by Proscriptor

References

2009 albums
Absu (band) albums